MS Norcape was a ro-ro freight vessel built for the British ferry company P&O Ferries. She was built in 1979 by Mitsui Engineering & Shipbuilding, Japan as Puma. Later that year, she was renamed Tipperary and began service with B&I Line, operating between Liverpool and Dublin. After 10 years she was transferred to P&O North Sea Ferries and renamed as Norcape. She was laid up in Liverpool in 2010 before going to refit and transferring to the Larne Troon route.  She was sold for scrap following a grounding in Troon and cut up in Aliağa, Turkey.

Footnotes

External links
 MV Norcape - MidShip Photos

1979 ships
Ships built by Mitsui Engineering and Shipbuilding
Ships of P&O Ferries